"Mi Marciana" is a song recorded by the Spanish singer-songwriter Alejandro Sanz. It was released as the third single from his ninth studio album La Música No Se Toca (2012). The song was released for digital download on 6 December 2012.

Song information 
Mi Marciana is the third single of Sanz's ninth studio album La Música No Se Toca and was written by Alejandro Sanz and co-produced by Sanz and Colombian producer, musician, and songwriter, Julio Reyes Copello. Sanz received a Record of the Year and Song of the Year nominations at the 14th Latin Grammy Awards for the song. The song was also nominated for a 2014 Lo Nuestro Award for Video of the Year and Pop Song of the Year.

Live Performances
Sanz performed this song on several stages including his recent worldwide tour. One of the best performances occurred on 12 December 2012, on the program La Voz España, when he performed with the four finalists of the show.

Track listing

Charts

Weekly charts

Year-end charts

References

External links
"Mi Marciana" Lyrics

2012 singles
Alejandro Sanz songs
Songs written by Alejandro Sanz
Spanish-language songs
Pop ballads
Universal Music Latino singles
2012 songs
Song recordings produced by Julio Reyes Copello